Obongi District  is a district in Northern Uganda. The district headquarters are located in Obongi town. It was carved out of Moyo District and its operations started on Monday 1 July 2019. The population is 49,100, divided over five subcounties of Palorinya, Gimara, Itula, Aliba, Ewafa and one town council. It sends two MPs to the Parliament of Uganda who are Honorable Bhoka George Didi, the directly elected MP, and Maneno Zumura the Woman Member of Parliament.

References

Districts of Uganda